Gensui Prince , also known as Prince Yamagata Kyōsuke, was a senior-ranking Japanese military commander, twice-elected Prime Minister of Japan, and a leading member of the genrō, an élite group of senior statesmen who dominated Japan after the Meiji Restoration. As the Imperial Japanese Army's inaugural Chief of Staff, he was the chief architect of the Empire of Japan's military and its reactionary ideology. For this reason, some historians consider Yamagata to be the “father” of Japanese militarism.

During the latter part of the Meiji Era, Yamagata vied against Marquess Itō Hirobumi for control over the nation's policies. After Itō was assassinated in 1909, he became the most powerful figure in Japan save for the Emperor himself. Henceforth, Prince Yamagata oversaw all policymaking within the empire until a falling-out with the Imperial family resulted in him losing power shortly before his death in February 1922.

Early career

Yamagata Tatsunosuke was born on 14 June 1838, in Kawashima, Abu, below Hagi Castle (present-day Hagi, Yamaguchi Prefecture), the eldest son of samurai foot soldier (ashigaru) Yamagata Aritoshi. His father was a low-ranking samurai who carried weaponry during wartime and was a petty official at the town magistrate office (machi-bugyō-sho) during peacetime. Yamagata's mother died when he was 4 years old, and he was raised by his strict grandmother. Although Aritoshi was a petty town magistrate official, he studied kokugaku, wrote poetry, and excelled in academics. Yamagata was taught academics by his father Aritoshi. He had his coming of age ceremony (genpuku) at age 15, and started off as a petty official at the Chōshū Domain and then at the Meirinkan. Later, he served the territorial magistrate (daikan), going from village to village learning general duties of a samurai official. His childhood name was Tatsunosuke, after which he was briefly known as Kosuke and Kyōsuke, before changing his name to Aritomo after the Meiji Restoration.

He went to Shokasonjuku, a private school run by Yoshida Shōin, where he was active in the growing underground movement to overthrow the Tokugawa shogunate. He was a commander in the Kiheitai, a paramilitary organization created on semi-western lines by the Chōshū domain. During the Boshin War, the revolution of 1867 and 1868 often called the Meiji Restoration, he was a staff officer.

After the defeat of the Tokugawa, Yamagata together with Saigō Tsugumichi was selected by the leaders of the new government to go to Europe in 1869 to research European military systems. Yamagata like many Japanese was strongly influenced by the striking success of Prussia in transforming itself from an agricultural state to a leading industrial and military power. He accepted Prussian political ideas, which favored military expansion abroad and authoritarian government at home. On returning he was asked to organize a national army for Japan, and he became War Minister in 1873. Yamagata energetically modernized the fledgling Imperial Japanese Army, and modeled it after the Prussian Army. He began a system of military conscription in 1873.

Military career

As War Minister, Yamagata pushed through the foundation of the Imperial Japanese Army General Staff, which was the main source of Yamagata's political power and that of other military officers through the end of World War I. He was Chief of the Army General Staff in 1878–1882, 1884–85 and 1904–1905.

Yamagata in 1877 led the newly modernized Imperial Army against the Satsuma Rebellion led by his former comrade in revolution, Saigō Takamori of Satsuma. At the end of the war, when Saigo's severed head was brought to Yamagata, he ordered it washed, and held the head in his arms as he pronounced a meditation on the fallen hero.

He also prompted Emperor Meiji to write the Imperial Rescript to Soldiers and Sailors, in 1882. This document was considered the moral core of the Japanese Army and Naval forces until their dissolution in 1945.

Yamagata was awarded the rank of field marshal in 1898. Throughout his long career, he amassed extensive leadership experience managing battlefield strategy and other military-related issues as the acting War Minister and Commanding General during the First Sino-Japanese War; the Commanding General of the Japanese First Army during the Russo-Japanese War; and as the Chief of the General Staff Office in Tokyo.  Additionally, he was the founding father of Japan's Hokushin-ron policy due to his central role in drawing up a preliminary national defensive strategy against Russia following the Russo-Japanese War.

Political career
Yamagata was one of seven elite political figures, later called the genrō, who came to dominate the government of Japan. The word can be translated principal elders or senior statesmen. The genrō were a subset of the revolutionary leaders who shared common objectives and who by about 1880 had forced out or isolated the other original leaders. These seven men (plus two who were chosen later after some of the first seven had died) led Japan for many years, through its great transformation from an agricultural country into a modern military and industrial state. All the genrō served at various times as cabinet ministers, and most were at times prime minister. As a body, the genrō had no official status, they were simply trusted advisers to the Emperor. Yet the genrō collectively made the most important decisions, such as peace and war and foreign policy, and when a cabinet resigned they chose the new prime minister. In the twentieth century their power diminished because of deaths and quarrels among themselves, and the growing political power of the Army and Navy. But the genrō clung to the power of naming prime ministers up to the death of the last genrō, Prince Saionji in 1940.

Yamagata also held a large and devoted power base among officers in the army and militarists in Japanese society. He profoundly distrusted all democratic institutions, and constantly strove to undercut their influence as a member of the genrō. Likewise, he devoted the later part of his life defending the privileges of the Restoration regime's institutions, especially those held by the army. 

During his long and versatile career, Yamagata held numerous important governmental posts. In 1882, he became president of the Board of Legislation (Sanjiin) and as Home Minister (1883–87) he worked vigorously to suppress political parties and repress agitation in the labor and agrarian movements. He also organized a system of local administration, based on a prefecture-county-city structure which is still in use in Japan today. In 1883 Yamagata was appointed to the post of Lord Chancellor, the highest bureaucratic position in the government system before the Meiji Constitution of 1889.

After the creation of the Cabinet of Japan, Yamagata became the third Prime Minister of Japan. During his first term from December 24, 1889, to May 6, 1891, he became the first prime minister compelled to share power with a partially-elected Imperial Diet under the Meiji Constitution which took effect in 1890. On October 30, 1890, he presided over the enactment of the Imperial Rescript on Education. In order to pass a budget for the fiscal year 1891 (beginning in April), he had to negotiate with a liberal majority in the House of Representatives, the elected lower house of the Diet. Yamagata became Prime Minister for a second term from November 8, 1898, to October 19, 1900. In 1900, while in his second term as Prime Minister, he ruled that only an active military officer could serve as War Minister or Navy Minister, a rule that gave the military control over the formation of any future cabinet. He also enacted laws preventing political party members from holding any key posts in the bureaucracy.

In addition to his service as Prime Minister, Yamagata obtained considerable experience traveling abroad as a diplomat. Attending the coronation of the Russian Czar Nicholas II on November 1, 1894, he made a tentative offer to Spain on buying the Philippines for £40 million. Likewise, in 1896, he led a diplomatic mission to Moscow, which produced the Yamagata–Lobanov Agreement confirming Japanese and Russian rights in Korea

Yamagata also served as President of the Privy Council from 1893 to 1894 and 1905 to 1922. While serving his second term as president in 1907, he was elevated to the peerage and received the title of koshaku (prince) under the Japanese kazoku system.

From 1900 to 1909, Yamagata opposed Itō Hirobumi, leader of the civilian party, and exercised influence through his protégé, Katsura Tarō. After the assassination of Itō Hirobumi in 1909, Yamagata became the most influential statesman in Japan and remained so until his death in 1922, although he retired from active participation in politics after the Russo-Japanese War. As president of the Privy Council from 1909 to 1922, Yamagata remained the power behind the government and dictated the selection of future Prime Ministers until his death. However, his power was greatly damaged in 1921 when he expressed strong opposition to the engagement of Hirohito and Nagako citing color blindness of Nagako's family. The Imperial family struggled against the pressure from Yamagata and the couple eventually managed to get married.

In 1912 Yamagata set the precedent that the army could dismiss a cabinet. A dispute with Prime Minister Marquis Saionji Kinmochi over the military budget became a constitutional crisis, known as the Taisho Crisis after the newly enthroned Emperor. The army minister, General Uehara Yūsaku, resigned when the cabinet would not grant him the budget he wanted. Saionji sought to replace him. Japanese law required that the ministers of the army and navy must be high-ranking generals and admirals on active duty (not retired). In this instance all the eligible generals at Yamagata's instigation refused to serve in the Saionji cabinet, and the cabinet was compelled to resign.

Personal life and hobbies

Prince Yamagata was a talented garden designer, and today the gardens he designed are considered masterpieces of Japanese gardens. A noted example is the garden of the villa Murin-an in Kyoto.

As Yamagata had no children, he adopted a nephew, the second son of his eldest sister, to be his heir. Yamagata Isaburō subsequently assisted his adopted father by serving as a career bureaucrat, cabinet minister, and head of the civilian administration of Korea.

Awards

Japanese

Peerages in the Kazoku and other titles
Count (July 7, 1884)
Genrō (May 26, 1895)
Marquis (August 5, 1895)
Gensui (January 20, 1898)
Prince (September 21, 1907)

Decorations
Grand Cordon of the Order of the Rising Sun, 2 November 1877
Grand Cordon of the Order of the Rising Sun, with Paulownia Blossoms, 5 August 1895
Grand Cordon of the Order of the Chrysanthemum, 3 June 1902; Collar, 1 April 1906
Order of the Golden Kite, 2nd Class, 5 August 1895; 1st Class, 1 April 1906

Order of precedence
Fifth Rank, August 1870
Fourth Rank, December 1872
Third Rank, December 1884
Second Rank, October 1886
Senior Second Rank, 20 December 1895
Junior First Rank, 1 February 1922 (posthumous)

Foreign
:
Knight of the Royal Order of the Crown, 1st Class, 22 December 1886
Grand Cross of the Order of the Red Eagle, 14 June 1899
: Grand Cross of the Royal Military Order of Our Lord Jesus Christ, 25 August 1887
: Grand Cross of the Order of Saints Maurice and Lazarus, 30 October 1889
  Austria-Hungary: Knight of the Order of the Iron Crown, 1st Class, 22 November 1890
: Grand Cross of the Legion of Honour, 7 May 1897
: 
Honorary Member of the Order of Merit, with Swords, 21 February 1906
Honorary Knight Grand Cross of the Order of St Michael and St George, 3 July 1918
: Knight of the Order of St. Alexander Nevsky, 14 January 1916

Notes

References

 OCLC 482814571

 ; OCLC 12311985

External links
 

|-

|-

|-

|-

|-

 
|- 

|-

|-

|-

1838 births
1922 deaths
19th-century prime ministers of Japan
Government ministers of Japan
Japanese generals
Japanese people of the Russo-Japanese War
Japanese tea masters
Kazoku
Marshals of Japan
Ministers of Home Affairs of Japan
Mōri retainers
Nobles of the Meiji Restoration
People from Chōshū domain
Military personnel from Yamaguchi Prefecture
People of the Boshin War
Japanese military personnel of the First Sino-Japanese War
Prime Ministers of Japan
Imperial Japanese Army officers
Samurai

Recipients of the Order of the Golden Kite
Recipients of the Order of the Rising Sun with Paulownia Flowers
Grand Crosses of the Order of Christ (Portugal)
Knights Grand Cross of the Order of Saints Maurice and Lazarus
Grand Croix of the Légion d'honneur
Honorary Knights Grand Cross of the Order of St Michael and St George
Honorary members of the Order of Merit